Thinner (marketed as Stephen King's Thinner) is a 1996 American body horror film directed by Tom Holland and written by Michael McDowell and Holland. The film is based on Stephen King's 1984 novel of the same name (which he wrote under the pseudonym Richard Bachman) and stars Robert John Burke, Joe Mantegna, Lucinda Jenney, Michael Constantine, Kari Wuhrer, and Bethany Joy Lenz.

Plot
Billy Halleck is an obese upper class lawyer who lives with his wife Heidi and their daughter Linda in Connecticut. Billy recently defended an underworld Mafia boss named Richie "The Hammer" Ginelli in court and is now celebrating his acquittal on a murder charge. Heidi, trying to persuade him to forget about his obsession with food, tries to give Billy oral sex as he is driving. Distracted, Billy accidentally runs over an elderly Romani woman named Suzanne Lempke, killing her. He is acquitted in the proceedings by his friend Judge Cary Rossington. The local police chief Duncan Hopley also obstructs the case by committing perjury for Billy.

Outraged by the injustice, Suzanne's father, Tadzu Lempke, places a curse on Billy on the steps of the courthouse by touching his face and uttering "Thinner". Soon afterward, Billy begins to lose weight rapidly despite not exercising or sticking to his diet. Heidi, fearing the weight loss may be due to cancer, calls Dr. Mike Houston, with whom Billy begins to suspect his wife is having an affair. Billy learns that Rossington and Hopley have also been cursed; Rossington has been metamorphosed into a lizard-like being, while Hopley develops purulent ulcers on his face and hands. Both Rossington and Hopley commit suicide. Billy tracks down the Romani camp and tries to reason with Tadzu; Tadzu threatens to make the curse worse if he doesn’t leave. Gina, Tadzu's great-granddaughter, uses her slingshot to shoot a large ball bearing which goes through Billy's hand, infuriating him into vowing revenge against Tadzu and the other Romani people who live there.

Billy enlists Ginelli to attack the Romani camp and persuade Tadzu to lift the curse. Chanting a spell, Tadzu mixes Billy's blood into a strawberry pie. Tadzu states that if someone else eats the pie, the curse will kill them quickly and Billy will be spared. He urges Billy to eat the pie himself and die with dignity but Billy refuses. Billy arrives home and gives Heidi the strawberry pie. She delightedly eats a piece. The next morning, Billy finds her desiccated corpse next to him. He is gleeful to be free of the curse and of what he believes is his disloyal wife. However, when he goes downstairs, he discovers that his daughter has eaten some of the pie for breakfast. Wracked with guilt, he prepares to eat the rest of the pie. However, he is interrupted by Mike at the door. Mike grows uncomfortable and struggles to explain his unannounced presence, seemingly confirming Billy's suspicions of an affair between Mike and Heidi. Billy invites Mike in for a piece of the pie and closes the door with a smirk.

Cast

Production

In order to depict Billy Halleck as overweight, makeup effects artist Greg Cannom created a number of fatsuits for actor Robert John Burke to wear, along with latex pieces to make his face appear fatter. Cannom also designed a full-body suit with silicone breast implants, which Burke wore during a scene in which Billy is shown taking a shower.

Critical reception
Thinner  received mostly negative reviews from critics. The film holds an approval rating of 13% on Rotten Tomatoes based on 23 reviews, with an average rating of 3.3/10. The critical consensus reads: "A bland, weightless horror film that seems to want to mock itself as the proceedings drag on." On Metacritic, the film has a weighted average score of 33 out of 100 based on 14 critic reviews, indicating "generally unfavorable reviews".

James Berardinelli gave the film two stars out of four, writing: "Thinner could have been an opportunity to examine the ethics of a slick lawyer who refuses to accept responsibility for his actions. [...] Unfortunately, questions of morality are of secondary importance to a film that emphasizes its Death Wish aspects." Owen Gleiberman of Entertainment Weekly gave the film a "D" rating, writing: "Like too many Stephen King movies, Thinner is all (emaciated) concept and no follow-through." The Austin Chronicles Marc Savlov gave the film a rating of one out of five stars, writing that, "Apart from its rushed pacing and occasionally stale dialogue, Thinner suffers even more from the fact that it has no redeemable characters."

Varietys Leonard Klady referred to the film as a "banally scripted and directed effort", as well as "one of the more pedestrian translations of the shockmeister's books". A more positive review came from Mick LaSalle of the San Francisco Chronicle, who called Thinner "one of the better Stephen King-derived movies." Lawrence Van Gelder of The New York Times, in his review of the film, wrote: "The production is slick, the Maine scenery is bracing, the characters are well-acted, and in a mumbo-jumbo movie with a few loose ends, the makeup central to the plot and applied by Greg Cannom and Bob Laden to Robert John Burke in the leading role is most admirable."

In a retrospective review, Nathan Rabin of The A.V. Club gave the film a "D−", writing that "Thinners problems begin with a grotesquely unconvincing fat suit and makeup", and that Burke's "cartoonish performance matches the tone of a film that's broadly comic and often just plain broad without containing much in the way of jokes, let alone genuine wit or suspense."

Notes

References

External links
 
  
  
 

1996 films
1996 horror films
1990s supernatural horror films
American supernatural horror films
American body horror films
1990s English-language films
Films about curses
Films based on American horror novels
Films about eating disorders
American films about revenge
Films based on works by Stephen King
Films directed by Tom Holland
Films set in Connecticut
Films shot in Maine
Films shot in New Hampshire
Paramount Pictures films
Films about Romani people
Spelling Films films
Films scored by Daniel Licht
1990s American films